Eupholidoptera chabrieri is a species of katydid belonging to the subfamily Tettigoniinae.

Subspecies
 Eupholidoptera chabrieri bimucronata (Ramme, 1927) 
 Eupholidoptera chabrieri brunneri (Targioni-Tozzetti, 1881) 
 Eupholidoptera chabrieri chabrieri (Charpentier, 1825) 
 Eupholidoptera chabrieri galvagnii Adamovic, 1972 
 Eupholidoptera chabrieri garganica La Greca, 1959 
 Eupholidoptera chabrieri schmidti (Fieber, 1861) 
 Eupholidoptera chabrieri usi Adamovic, 1972

Distribution and habitat
These crickets are mainly present in France, southern Switzerland, Italy, Slovenia, Romania and in Greece. They can be encountered in forest edges, clearings, thickets and shrubs.

Description

The adults reach  of length. The basic coloration of the body varies from green to light green and yellow green. The top of the head is orange, with a few black spots in the front.

The compound eyes are pale brown. The antennae are longer than the body. The flat, extended pronotum shows a black band, with an orange-yellow lateral contour. The abdomen is green and quite thick, with a yellow bottom and a black last segment. This species is remarkably long-legged, with a striking pattern of black spots and drawings and small spines on the hind legs.

In the females the tiny dark brown wings are partially hidden under the pronotum, while the males have very short tegmina. The females have a slightly curved ovipositor, which is somewhat shorter than the body.

Biology
Adults can be found from July through September. This species start breeding in July. Only eggs overwinter, hatching in next April. The song of these crickets consists of short, high-frequency single sounds, usually presented in series at a distance of a few seconds.

Gallery

References

 Ciplak B., K.-G. Heller, F. Willemse (2009) - Review of the genus Eupholidoptera (Orthoptera, Tettigoniidae): different genitalia, uniform song Zootaxa 2156: 1–75 (Publication date: 7/13/2009)

Tettigoniinae
Insects described in 1825
Taxa named by Toussaint de Charpentier
Orthoptera of Europe